Nightmare Cinema is a 2018 American horror anthology film featuring work by directors Alejandro Brugués, Joe Dante,  Mick Garris, Ryūhei Kitamura, and David Slade.

Plot 
Five strangers converge at a haunted movie theater owned by The Projectionist (Mickey Rourke). Once inside, the audience members witness a series of screenings that shows them their deepest fears and darkest secrets over five tales.

 The Thing in the Woods (D: Alejandro Brugués), a postmodern sendup of slasher thrillers, involving a killer who is not what he seems. Starring Eric Nelsen, Sarah Withers, Kevin Fonteyne, and Chris Warren. 
 Mirari (D: Joe Dante), a woman with facial scars seeks plastic surgery at a sinister clinic. Starring Richard Chamberlain, Zarah Mahler, Mark Grossman, and Belinda Balaski.
 Mashit (D: Ryūhei Kitamura), Catholic schoolgirls become possessed by a sex-crazed demon. Starring Maurice Benard, Stephanie Cood, Calista Bess, and Mariela Garriga.
 This Way to Egress (D: David Slade), a woman waiting for a doctor's appointment experiences disturbing shifts in reality. Starring Elizabeth Reaser, Adam Godley, Ezra Buzzington, Bronwyn Merrill, and Patrick Wilson. 
 Dead (D: Mick Garris), an adolescent piano prodigy dies, is revived, and is under attack from supernatural forces. Starring Faly Rakotohavan, Annabeth Gish, Daryl C. Brown, Lexy Panterra, and Orson Chaplin.

Production 
The project was announced in September 2017 with the five directors attached and Rourke as the storyteller. Filming took place in the United States in November and December 2017. Bruno Kohfield-Galeano provided his voice for an uncredited ADR loop group session and voiced Mr. Stitches and was also given special thanks in the credits.

Release 
The film had its world premiere at the Fantasia International Film Festival in Canada on July 13, 2018. It received a limited release in the United States on June 21, 2019.

Reception

Critical response 
Its consensus reads, "Admirably eclectic yet more consistent than most horror anthologies, Nightmare Cinema should entertain viewers in the mood for a good old-fashioned creepshow." On Metacritic, the film has a weighted average score of 59 out of 100, based on 8 critics, indicating "mixed or average reviews". Dennis Harvey, writing for Variety, gave the film a favorable review and called it an "uneven but fun compendium of scare tales."

According to the Movie and Television Review and Classification Board of the Philippines (MTRCB), the material contains horror, violence, gore, cuss language, and sexuality which may require restriction of public exhibition to audiences eighteen (18) years of age and above. The MTRCB classified the film as rated R-18.

References

External links 
 
 

2018 films
2018 horror films
2010s slasher films
American black-and-white films
American comedy horror films
American horror anthology films
American slasher films
American science fiction horror films
American supernatural horror films
Cinelou Films films
Films directed by Joe Dante
Films directed by Mick Garris
Films directed by David Slade
Films directed by Ryuhei Kitamura
Films scored by Richard Band
Films about spiders
Religious horror films
Alien invasions in films
Supernatural slasher films
Films with screenplays by Mick Garris
Films produced by Mick Garris
Films with screenplays by Richard Christian Matheson
Films set in a movie theatre
2010s American films